The enzyme choloyl-CoA hydrolase (EC 3.1.2.27) catalyzes the reaction

choloyl-CoA + H2O  cholate + CoA

This enzyme belongs to the family of hydrolases, specifically those acting on thioester bonds.  The systematic name is choloyl-CoA hydrolase. Other names in common use include PTE-2 (ambiguous), choloyl-coenzyme A thioesterase, chenodeoxycholoyl-coenzyme A thioesterase, and peroxisomal acyl-CoA thioesterase 2.

References

 
 
 

EC 3.1.2
Enzymes of unknown structure